Operative temperature is defined as a uniform temperature of an imaginary black enclosure in which an occupant would exchange the same amount of heat by radiation plus convection as in the actual nonuniform environment. Some references also use the terms 'equivalent temperature" or 'effective temperature' to describe combined effects of convective and radiant heat transfer. In design, operative temperature can be defined as the average of the mean radiant and ambient air temperatures, weighted by their respective heat transfer coefficients. The instrument used for assessing environmental thermal comfort in terms of operative temperature is called a eupatheoscope and was invented by A. F. Dufton in 1929. Mathematically, operative temperature can be shown as;

where,

 = convective heat transfer coefficient
 = linear radiative heat transfer coefficient
 = air temperature
 = mean radiant temperature

Or

 

where,

 = air velocity
 and  have the same meaning as above.

It is also acceptable to approximate this relationship for occupants engaged in near sedentary physical activity (with metabolic rates between 1.0 met and 1.3 met), not in direct sunlight, and not exposed to air velocities greater than 0.10 m/s (20 fpm).  

where  and  have the same meaning as above.

Application

Operative temperature is used in heat transfer and thermal comfort analysis in transportation and buildings. Most psychrometric charts used in HVAC design only show the dry bulb temperature on the x-axis(abscissa), however, it is the operative temperature which is specified on the x-axis of the psychrometric chart illustrated in ANSI/ASHRAE Standard 55 – Thermal Environmental Conditions for Human occupancy.

See also
HVAC
Psychrometrics
Underfloor heating
ASHRAE

References

Heating, ventilation, and air conditioning